Jonathan and Darlene's Greatest Hits is a 1993 compilation album of songs by Paul Weston and Jo Stafford recorded in the guise of Jonathan and Darlene Edwards, a New Jersey lounge act who performed deliberately off-key, putting their own interpretation on popular songs. The album was released by Corinthian Records on September 11, 1993.

Track listing

 I Love Paris
 Dizzy Fingers
 Take the "A" Train
 You're Blase
 Alabama Bound
 Nola
 I Am Woman
 Don't Get Around Much Anymore
 The Last Time I Saw Paris
 Honeysuckle Rose
 Autumn in New York
 Be My Little Baby Bumble Bee
 April in Paris
 Stayin' Alive

References

External links
A review

1993 greatest hits albums
Jonathan and Darlene Edwards albums
Corinthian Records compilation albums
Jo Stafford compilation albums
Collaborative albums
Comedy compilation albums
1990s comedy albums